Josef "Sepp" Wurmheller (4 May 1917 – 22 June 1944) was a German Luftwaffe pilot during World War II, a fighter ace credited with 102 enemy aircraft shot down in over 300 combat missions. He claimed the majority of his aerial victories over the Western Front, and nine over the Eastern Front. Of his 93 victories over the Western Allies, at least 18–20 were four-engined bombers and 56 were against Supermarine Spitfire fighters.

Born in Hausham, Wurmheller was a glider pilot in his youth, and volunteered for military service in the Luftwaffe of Nazi Germany in 1937. Following flight training he was posted to Jagdgeschwader 53 (JG 53—53rd Fighter Wing) in 1939. He claimed his first aerial victory on the Western Front on 30 September 1939, a phase of World War II dubbed the Phoney War. He then served as a flight instructor before returning to JG 53 for the Battle of Britain. In June 1941 he participated in Operation Barbarossa, the German invasion of the Soviet Union. He was awarded the Knight's Cross of the Iron Cross on 4 September 1941 after 32 victories. Following another tour as fighter pilot instructor, he was posted to Jagdgeschwader 2 "Richthofen" (JG 2—2nd Fighter Wing) operating on the Channel Front. Wurmheller claimed seven aerial victories during the Dieppe Raid on 19 August 1942 and after his 67th victory was awarded the Knight's Cross of the Iron Cross with Oak Leaves on 1 October 1942.

In April 1943, Wurmheller was appointed Staffelkapitän (squadron leader) of 9. Staffel (9th squadron) of JG 2 "Richthofen". On 8 June 1944, two days after the Allied Invasion of Normandy, he was given command of III. Gruppe (3rd group) of JG 2 "Richthofen". He and his wingman were killed in a mid-air collision during combat near Alençon, France, on 22 June 1944. Wurmheller was posthumously promoted to Major (major) and was awarded the Knight's Cross of the Iron Cross with Oak Leaves and Swords on 24 October 1944.

Early life and career
Wurmheller was born on 4 May 1917 in Hausham in the Kingdom of Bavaria, a federated state of the German Empire. After growing up on his uncle's farm at Schliersee, he spent four years working as a miner like his father. He was also an enthusiastic glider pilot and in 1937 he volunteered for military service in the Luftwaffe. Following training as a fighter pilot, Wurmheller, holding the rank of Unteroffizier (sergeant), was posted to 2. Staffel (2nd squadron) of Jagdgeschwader 53 (JG 53—53rd Fighter Wing) in 1939.

World War II
World War II in Europe began on Friday, 1 September 1939, when German forces invaded Poland. On 30 September, elements of I. Gruppe (1st group) of JG 53 encountered a formation of five Royal Air Force (RAF) Fairey Battle single-engined bombers in the vicinity of Saarbrücken during the early Phoney War period. Wurmheller claimed his first victory during this encounter. The Fairey Battle K9283, of No. 150 Squadron flown by Squadron Leader William MacDonald, was on an aerial reconnaissance mission in the area from Metzing to Saarbrücken and crash-landed at Écury-sur-Coole. For this victory, Wurmheller received the Iron Cross 2nd Class on 19 October 1939. He was posted to the Jagdfliegerschule (fighter pilot school) at Werneuchen as an instructor in November 1939.

Battle of Britain and Eastern Front
Following a tour as an instructor at the Luftwaffe fighter pilot school, Wurmheller returned to 5. Staffel of JG 53 in June 1940. During the Battle of Britain, he flew combat missions as a fighter pilot and as a fighter-bomber pilot. He claimed four further victories in this campaign and was awarded the Iron Cross 1st Class on 16 October 1940. He was shot down three times himself by RAF fighters and each time had to bail out. On the third occasion, he was shot down in Messerschmitt Bf 109 E-4 (Werknummer 5242—factory number) at approximately 5:10 pm on 23 November over the English Channel and had to swim for four-and-a-half hours before he was rescued by a Schnellboot (E-boat) of the Kriegsmarine (Navy). Hospitalized until March 1941, he returned to combat duty and claimed two Supermarine Spitfires shot down on 7 May 1941, his 9th and 10th victories.

Wurmheller's unit was subsequently transferred to the Eastern Front in preparation for Operation Barbarossa, the German invasion of the Soviet Union, which began on 22 June 1941. During Barbarossa he was deployed in the southern sector of the German advance. He added nine victories—eight bombers and one Polikarpov I-16 "Rata" fighter—in this theater of operations. His last victory on the Eastern Front, his 19th overall, was claimed on 15 July 1941.

Channel Front

Wurmheller was transferred back to the Channel Front on 20 July 1941. He was assigned to the Stab (headquarters unit) of II. Gruppe of Jagdgeschwader 2 "Richthofen" (JG 2—2nd Fighter Wing), named after the World War I fighter ace Manfred von Richthofen. He claimed his 20th aerial victory on 24 July 1941 and over a period of four weeks claimed a further 12 victories, all over Spitfires, including five in one day, making him an "ace-in-a-day".

On 30 August 1941, Wurmheller was awarded the Honor Goblet of the Luftwaffe, and on 4 September he was awarded the Knight's Cross of the Iron Cross for 32 aerial victories. His former unit, 5. Staffel of JG 53, had nominated him for the Knight's Cross, but the nomination was not approved until he was assigned to JG 2 "Richthofen". On the same day, his fellow II. Gruppe pilot Oberfeldwebel Kurt Bühligen also received the Knight's Cross. At the time, Wurmheller flew a Bf 109 F-2 from the airbase at St Pol-Bryas.

Following a minor injury, Wurmheller was again posted to the fighter pilot school in Werneuchen as an instructor. Upon his return to front line duty in May 1942, he was posted to 1. Staffel and claimed 10 victories during May 1942 and a further 12 victories the following month. Among these claims were four Spitfires shot down on 31 May and five on 5 June 1942. Most of these missions were flown with Rudolf Pflanz as his wingman.

Wurmheller's most successful day as a fighter pilot was during the Dieppe Raid on 19 August 1942. On that day, the Allies unsuccessfully attacked the German-occupied port of Dieppe. Over 6,000 infantrymen, predominantly Canadian, were supported by a Canadian armored regiment and a strong force of Royal Marines and smaller RAF landing contingents. Wurmheller, whose right foot was plastered in an orthopedic cast, claimed seven victories during the course of four combat missions that day, six Spitfires and a Bristol Blenheim bomber. The Blenheim most likely was a misidentified Martin Baltimore. He had to abort his first mission due to engine trouble, suffering a minor concussion in the forced landing. He returned from his second mission claiming two Spitfires and a Blenheim shot down. His third mission resulted in the destruction of three more Spitfires, his 56th to 58th victories. Wurmheller claimed another Spitfire shot down on his fourth combat mission. The next day, 20 August, he claimed his 60th aerial victory, which earned him the German Cross in Gold; it was awarded on 21 August.

Wurmheller was promoted to Leutnant (second lieutenant) for bravery in the face of the enemy on 1 October 1942. Following his 67th aerial victory, achieved in about 150 combat missions, he was awarded the Knight's Cross of the Iron Cross with Oak Leaves on 14 November 1942. He was the 146th officer or soldier of the Wehrmacht so honored.

The United States Army Air Forces (USAAF), in particular the Eighth Air Force, began regular combat when the VIII Bomber Command attacked the Rouen–Sotteville marshalling yards in France on 17 August 1942. Wurmheller claimed four Boeing B-17 Flying Fortress bombers shot down on 3 January 1943. On 1 April 1943 he was appointed Staffelkapitän (squadron leader) of 9. Staffel of JG 2 "Richthofen", succeeding Hauptmann (Captain) Siegfried Schnell, who was transferred to III. Gruppe of Jagdgeschwader 54 (JG 54—54th Fighter Wing). Wurmheller claimed his 70th victory on 17 May, when he shot down a B-17.

On 23 September, Wurmheller was wounded by bomb splinters while making an emergency landing in his Focke-Wulf Fw 190 A-6 during a bombing raid at Vannes–Meucon. "Sepp", as he was named by his comrades, was promoted to Oberleutnant (first lieutenant) on 1 August 1943 and to Hauptmann on 1 November 1943. He claimed his first heavy bomber in the Defense of the Reich campaign on 8 February 1944 in the vicinity of Le Tréport. By March 1944, his total number of aerial victories had reached 92 claims.

Group commander and death

Wurmheller claimed further aerial victories following the Allied invasion of Normandy on 6 June 1944. He was appointed Gruppenkommandeur (group commander) of III. Gruppe of JG 2 "Richthofen" on 8 June, succeeding Hauptmann Herbert Huppertz who was killed in action near Caen earlier that day. Wurmheller claimed the last three victories of his total of 102 on 16 June 1944. He was the 80th Luftwaffe pilot to achieve the century mark.

Wurmheller was killed in his Fw 190 A-8 (Werknummer 171 053) on 22 June 1944, when he collided with his wingman, Feldwebel (Staff Sergeant) Kurt Franzke, during aerial combat with USAAF Republic P-47 Thunderbolt and Royal Canadian Air Force (RCAF) Spitfire fighters near Alençon. He was posthumously awarded the Knight's Cross of the Iron Cross with Oak Leaves and Swords and promoted to the rank of Major (major) on 24 October 1944, which was back-dated to 1 June 1944. According to Goss, his victor may have been Pilot Officer J.W. Flemming from  No. 441 Fighter Squadron. Wurmheller and Franzke were buried beside each other at the Champigny-Saint-André German war cemetery, near Saint-André-de-l'Eure, in plot 9, graves 1704 and 1705 respectively. Command of III. Gruppe of JG 2 was then given to Hauptmann Siegfried Lemke.

Summary of career

Aerial victory claims
According to US historian David T. Zabecki, Wurmheller was credited with 102 aerial victories. Mathews and Foreman, authors of Luftwaffe Aces – Biographies and Victory Claims, researched the German Federal Archives and found records for 103 aerial victory claims, plus five further unconfirmed claims. This figure of confirmed claims includes nine Soviet Air Forces piloted aircraft on the Eastern Front and 94 on the Western Front, including 21 four-engined bomber.

Victory claims were logged to a map-reference (PQ = Planquadrat), for example "PQ 3841". These sectors were then subdivided into 36 smaller units to give a location area 3 × 4 km in size.

Awards
 Wound Badge in Black
 Front Flying Clasp of the Luftwaffe in Gold with Pennant "400"
 Combined Pilots-Observation Badge
 Iron Cross (1939)
 2nd Class (19 October 1939)
 1st Class (16 October 1940)
 Honor Goblet of the Luftwaffe (30 August 1941)
 German Cross in Gold on 21 August 1942 as Oberfeldwebel in the I./Jagdgeschwader 2
 Knight's Cross of the Iron Cross with Oak Leaves and Swords
 Knight's Cross on 4 September 1941 as Oberfeldwebel and pilot in the 9./Jagdgeschwader 2 "Richthofen"
 146th Oak Leaves on 13 November 1942 as Leutnant (war officer) and pilot in the 7./Jagdgeschwader 2 "Richthofen"
 108th Swords on 24 October 1944 (posthumously) as Hauptmann (war officer) and Gruppenkommandeur of the III./Jagdgeschwader 2 "Richthofen"

Notes

References

Citations

Bibliography

 
 
 
 
 
 
 
 
 
 
 
 
 
 
 
 
 
 
 
 
 
 
 
 
 
 
 

1917 births
1944 deaths
People from Miesbach (district)
Luftwaffe pilots
German World War II flying aces
Luftwaffe personnel killed in World War II
Recipients of the Gold German Cross
Recipients of the Knight's Cross of the Iron Cross with Oak Leaves and Swords
Burials at Champigny-Saint-André German war cemetery
Military personnel from Bavaria